The sack race or potato sack race is a competitive game in which participants place both of their legs inside a sack or pillow case that reaches their waist or neck and hop forward from a starting point toward a finish line. The first person to cross the finish line is the winner of the race.

Possible rule changes that people make to the traditional game include using extra large sacks and running inside the bag; however, in some cases such activity may be viewed as cheating.

Sack racing is traditionally seen as an activity for children, but people of any age can compete. In schools, the sack race often takes place on a Sports Day, along with numerous other events such as the egg and spoon race. It is also a frequent pastime at fairs, birthday parties, and picnics.

Records 
The fastest 100 metres sack race is 25.96 seconds and was achieved by Christian Roberto López Rodríguez in Yuncos, Spain, on 18 November 2020. Christian also holds the world record for the 200 metres sack race, he completed the distance in a time of 63.88 seconds on 3 January 2021.

The fastest 4x100 metres sack race is 2 minutes and 29.09 seconds and was achieved by Andrew Rodaughan, Patrick Holcombe, James Osbourne and Luke McFarlane in Beveridge, Australia, on 17 June 2003.

The fastest 1 mile sack race is 16 minutes 41 seconds and was achieved in Baruun Salaa in Mongolia by Ashrita Furman on 19 May 2007. Ashrita Furman also holds the record for fastest 10 km sack race finishing in 1 hour 22 minutes and 2 seconds, achieved in Montauk, USA on 23 April 2001

The record for largest sack race competition with 2095 competitors is held by Agnieton college in Zwolle, the Netherlands and was won on 11 October 2002.

Fastest 100m sack race—Official Guinness World Records

Fastest 200m sack race—Official Guinness World Records

Fastest 400m sack race—Unofficial World Records

References

External links 
 

Competitive games
Jumping sports
Novelty running